is a railway station located in the city of Mito, Ibaraki Prefecture, Japan operated by the East Japan Railway Company (JR East). It is also a freight depot for the Japan Freight Railway Company (JR Freight).

Lines
Uchihara Station is served by the Jōban Line and the Mito Line, and is located 103.5 km from the official starting point of the Jōban Line at Nippori Station.

Station layout
The station consists of one side platform and one island platform, connected to the station building by a footbridge. The station is staffed.

Platforms

History
Uchihara Station was opened on 16 January 1889. The station was absorbed into the JR East network upon the privatization of the Japanese National Railways (JNR) on 1 April 1987.

Passenger statistics
In fiscal 2019, the station was used by an average of 2758 passengers daily (boarding passengers only).

Surrounding area
 Aeon Mall Mito-Uchihara

See also
 List of railway stations in Japan

References

External links

  Station information JR East Station Information 

Railway stations in Ibaraki Prefecture
Jōban Line
Railway stations in Japan opened in 1889
Mito, Ibaraki
Stations of Japan Freight Railway Company